Maharani is an  2021 Indian Hindi-language drama streaming television series created by Subhash Kapoor. Season 1 of the series is directed by Karan Sharma and Season 2 will be directed by Ravindra Gautam. The series stars  Huma Qureshi as the protagonist along with Sohum Shah, Amit Sial, Kani Kusruti and Inaamulhaq. The political multi-seasons series is partly inspired by what happened in Bihar in the 1990s when Lalu Prasad Yadav made his homemaker wife Rabri Devi his successor. The story of season 1 is from 1995 to 1999 and is inspired from real life events and characters like Ranvir Sena,  left-wing militants, Naxalite groups , the Communist Party of India (Marxist–Leninist) Liberation , 1997 Laxmanpur Bathe massacre, Fodder Scam, Brahmeshwar Singh. The story of season 2 is from mid-1999 and is inspired from real life events and characters like Shilpi-Gautam Murder, Sadhu Yadav, Rajiv Goswami, Shibu Soren, Mohammad Shahabuddin, Prashant Kishor , Indian Political Action Committee (I-PAC) and 2000 Bihar Legislative Assembly election.
 
Maharani premiered on SonyLIV on 28 May 2021.

The teaser of the second season was launched on 16 July 2022 and the trailer was released on 1 August 2022.

The second season was launched on 25 August 2022 on SonyLIV.

Premise
This is a fictional story, where Rani Bharti is a homemaker and the wife of Bihar's chief minister Bheema. All she cares about is her house and her husband. She wants to pack her bags and go back to the village after her husband resigns from the post of Bihar's CM. But her life takes a turn when her husband and Bihar's CM is made to announce the name of his successor. While his party members look excited to hear who has been appointed, he makes Rani his successor, leaving everyone surprised.

Season 1

After being shot, the Bihar CM Bheema Bharti unexpectedly names his wife Rani as his successor. An uneducated woman who was content with her simple ways of living and her regular family life has to now deal with government files she couldn’t read, corruption, and caste massacres within the state. With the caste arithmetic, traditional satraps, and the emerging voices of dissent, will an illiterate woman, Rani Bharti survive this?

Season 2

As Bheema Bharti runs a proxy government from prison, CM Rani Bharti is accused of misgovernance while Bihar fights anti-incumbency, jungle raj, and corruption. Lawlessness has gripped the state of Bihar and the opposition holds Rani responsible for the state’s ‘jungle raj’.

Facing a constant turmoil of opposition from her own party and dealing with a husband and political enemies who are obstinately plotting to overthrow her government, she is forced to make some moves that will disrupt the whole political scenario. With elections right around the corner, will Rani's acumen turn victorious, given her own husband is her greatest enemy?

Cast
 Huma Qureshi as Rani Bharti, wife of Bihar's chief minister Bheema
 Sohum Shah as  Bihar's chief minister Bheema Bharti (season 1-2)
 Amit Sial as Navin Kumar, chief of Bihar People's Party
 Pramod Pathak as Satyendranath Mishra, RJSP chief secretary
 Kani Kusruti as Kaveri Sridharan, Rani's secretary
 Inaamulhaq as Parvez Alam 
 Vineet Kumar as Gauri Shankar Pandey
 Tanu Vidyarthi as Khyati
 Harish Khanna as Shankar Mahto
 Mohammad Aashique Hussain as Prem Kumar Chaubey
 Sushil Pandey as Kunwar Singh
 Kannan Arunachalam as DGP Siddhant Gautam
 Atul Tiwari as Governor Govardhan Daas
 Pankaj Jhaa as Diwakar Jhaa
 Anuja Sathe as Kirti Singh
 Neha Chauhan as Kalpana Kaul, director of political consultancy firm, I-ACT.
 Neeraj Kashyap
 Anushka Kaushik as Shilpa Agarwal
 Sukumar Tudu as Dulari Yadav
 Robin Das as Ekkal Munda
 Ansha Sayed as Sanjana Dutt
 Danish Iqbal as Dilshad Mirza
 Leysan Karimova as Zehra Shaikh
 Dibyendu Bhattacharya as Martin Ekka
 Kumar Saurabh as Sanyasi Rai
 Pranay Narayan as Kamta Prasad
 Agasthya Shanker as Jagganath Tripathi
 Vishwa Bhanu as Hemraj
 Alok Chatterjee as Mukhiya

Episodic Synopsis

Production
Sohum Shah gained a 12 kg to get look of the politician Bheema, which has been modelled on the basis of Lalu Prasad Yadav. In November 2020, some portions were shot in Kachnariya Kothi, Bhopal. In April 2021, the shooting for web series was also done in Legislative Assembly (LA) Jammu complex of the erstwhile Jammu and Kashmir state and Govt. Gandhi Memorial Science College, Jammu. Around 250 local artists from the theatre and cultural department in Jammu and Kashmir were brought in for the web-series. Some drone shots of J.P. Setu and Buddha Smriti Park were also shown in the web series. The shooting of Maharani was completed in seven months.

Reception

Critical response

Season 1

Writing for The Firstpost, Prathyush Parasuraman gave the series 3 stars and stated that Huma Qureshi shines in a sanitised portrayal of Rabri Devi. Rohan Naahar stated in The Hindustan Times that the series is over-plotted yet underwritten. Archika Khurana wrote in Times of India that the web series is engaging at most times.

The Times Of India described it as a “well-structured screenplay”, while Biz Asia pointed out how the show brings the importance of virtue to the forefront. Actress Twinkle Khanna praised the performance of Huma Qureshi in the web series. Actor Shatrughan Sinha also praised  Maharani and said that Huma Qureshi has the potential of becoming a role model for other artists.

Rishita Roy Chowdhury of India Today said the series is about Saheb, Biwi aur Bihar. Rohit Vats of News18 gave Maharani 2.5 stars. The Quint mentioned that Maharani lives up to the hype. Aditya Menon in The Quint wrote that the web series trid to invert the ‘Jungle Raj’ tag that was put on the Lalu Yadav-Rabri Devi period in Bihar.  Saibal Chatterjee of NDTV wrote that Maharani is a passable account of a state fighting steady decline and seeking regeneration.

Shubhra Gupta of The Indian Express stated that Huma Qureshi flourishes in a web series with banal writing.

Subhash. K.Jha called it a taut political drama with surprising twists and turns. Nandini Ramnath of Scroll.in wrote that the cast of Maharani has brilliant performances.

Rony Patra from LetsOTT stated that strong characters and an authentic Bihari milieu coupled with “bombastic dialogues” made the series a gripping watch. Rishita Roy Chowdhury of India Today went on to applaud Huma Qureshi's performance saying” she brings nuances and emotional gradients to her character.

Bollywood Life called it a sensational and intriguing game of political chess. Kriti Tulsiani from ZoomTV wrote that the show boasts of a captivating premise but falls victim to the makers’ linear storytelling approach.

BINGED called it a well-crafted chronicle of a story that needed telling.

Spotboye made the parallel with Scam 1992, calling it another big winner for SonyLIV.

Season 2

The Times of India gave it 3.5 stars out of 5 while stating that it is “An enthralling political drama with compelling performances.” Shashank Pandey of Dainik Bhaskar also gave the series a 3.5 out of five and hailed it as, ‘Emotion aur entertainment ki Maharani.’ ABP News, with its 4 stars out of 5, mentioned that ‘Maharani continues to rule the world of OTT’.

Abhimanyu Mathur of Hindustan Times remarked ‘Huma Qureshi reigns supreme in a show that is a lesson in how political thrillers should be made.’ Namrata Thakur of Rediff said, ‘The second season of Maharani 2 is bigger, better, and far more brutal’.

TV9 said that the second season was ‘Full of Unexpected twists and turns and gave it 4 stars out of 5.

Zoya Bhatti of ThePrint gave the Huma Qureshi starrer a 3.5 out of 5, commenting “Maharani 2 sees Rani Bharti go from political pawn to queen bee.” 

Nandini Ramnath from Scroll called the series “Another, more focused, round of self-serving politics.” Koimoi’s Shubham Kulkarni also gave the second season 3.5 stars out of 5 and said, “Huma Qureshi Continues To Reign.”

Controversy
After the release of first trailer on 9 May 2021, the Yadav community protested over a dialogue in the web series and filed FIR. The makers of web series later apologized and removed that dialogue from the web series.

See also
 Madam Chief Minister
 List of caste based violence in Bihar
 Khakee: The Bihar Chapter
 Article 15

References

External links
 
 Maharani Official Website

2021 Indian television series debuts
Television series based on actual events
Hindi-language television shows
Indian drama web series
Hindi-language web series